Pradeep Tamta (born 16 June 1958) is an Indian politician of  Indian National Congress (INC) from Uttarakhand state. He is currently serving as the member of the Rajya Sabha. He was the member of 15th Lok Sabha from Almora constituency and also served as the member of 1st Uttarakhand Assembly from Someshwar constituency.

Personal life 
He was born in Lob Village of Bageshwar district to Gusain Ram and Parvati Devi. He received a MA, B.ed and LLB from Kumaun University, Nainital district. He is married to Renu Tamta and has two daughters.

Positions held

Elections contested

Loksabha

Uttarakhand Legislative Assembly

References

1958 births
Living people
India MPs 2009–2014
People from Bageshwar district
Uttarakhand MLAs 2002–2007
Indian National Congress politicians
Lok Sabha members from Uttarakhand
United Progressive Alliance candidates in the 2014 Indian general election
Uttarakhand politicians
Rajya Sabha members from Uttarakhand
People from Almora district